Romero Osby (born May 7, 1990) is an American former professional basketball player who last played for Maccabi Kiryat Gat of the Israeli Premier League. He played college basketball for Mississippi State University and the University of Oklahoma.

Professional career
Osby was selected with the 51st overall pick by the Orlando Magic in the 2013 NBA draft. In July 2013, he joined the Magic for the 2013 NBA Summer League. On September 27, 2013, he signed with the Magic. However, he was later waived on October 25, 2013.

On November 4, 2013, the Fort Wayne Mad Ants, the D-League affiliate of the Magic, traded Osby's rights to the Maine Red Claws. On January 22, 2014, he was waived by the Red Claws due to a season-ending shoulder injury.

In July 2014, Osby re-joined the Orlando Magic for the 2014 NBA Summer League. He later signed with the Le Mans of the LNB Pro A for the 2014–15 season on July 25. After being ruled out for four months in late November with another shoulder injury, Le Mans and Osby finally parted ways on January 5, 2015. On February 5, 2015, he was reacquired by the Maine Red Claws. On April 20, 2015, he signed with Indios de Mayagüez of Puerto Rico for the rest of the 2015 BSN season. On May 29, 2015, he parted ways with Indios de Mayagüez.

On July 28, 2015, he signed with the French club JSF Nanterre. He left Nanterre after appearing in four league games, and on October 21, 2015, he signed with Maccabi Rishon LeZion of Israel. On December 7, 2015, he left Rishon LeZion and signed with Maccabi Kiryat Gat for the rest of the season.

References

External links
NBA D-League profile
NBADraft.net profile
FIBA.com profile

1990 births
Living people
American expatriate basketball people in France
American expatriate basketball people in Israel
Basketball players from Mississippi
Nanterre 92 players
Le Mans Sarthe Basket players
Maine Red Claws players
Maccabi Kiryat Gat B.C. players
Maccabi Rishon LeZion basketball players
Mississippi State Bulldogs men's basketball players
Oklahoma Sooners men's basketball players
Orlando Magic draft picks
Power forwards (basketball)
Sportspeople from Frankfurt
American men's basketball players
People from Lauderdale County, Mississippi